Offshore powerboat racing has had a long history in New Orleans, Louisiana. Races have been held in either Lake Pontchartrain or on the Mississippi River.

New Orleans was also the home port for the Popeyes Offshore race team from 1980 to 1990. The race team was formed by Al Copeland Sr., the founder of Popeyes Famous Fried Chicken & Biscuits Restaurants and Copeland's Restaurants. He was a six-time U.S. national champion and world champion in 1985 and 1986.

See also
Offshore powerboat racing

References

External links
superboat.com
apba.org

New Orleans, Louisiana
Sports competitions in New Orleans